Almond Valley (Gaelic: Srath Amain) is a constituency of the Scottish Parliament (Holyrood) covering part of the council area of West Lothian. It elects one Member of the Scottish Parliament (MSP) by the plurality (first past the post) method of election. It is also one of nine constituencies in the Lothian electoral region, which elects seven additional members, in addition to the nine constituency MSPs, to produce a form of proportional representation for the region as a whole.

The constituency was formed for the 2011 Scottish Parliament election, and comprises much of the old Livingston constituency. It is named for the River Almond which flows through Livingston. Since being formed the seat has been held Angela Constance of the Scottish National Party, who was formerly the MSP for Livingston.

Electoral region

The other eight constituencies of the Lothian region are Edinburgh Central, Edinburgh Eastern, Edinburgh Northern and Leith, Edinburgh Pentlands, Edinburgh Southern, Edinburgh Western, Linlithgow and Midlothian North and Musselburgh

The region includes all of the City of Edinburgh council area, parts of the East Lothian council area, parts of the Midlothian council area and all of the West Lothian council area.

Constituency boundaries and council area

The West Lothian council area is represented by two constituencies in the Scottish Parliament, these are Almond Valley and Linlithgow.

The new seat of Almond Valley replaces Livingston. The electoral wards used in its creation are:

In full: East Livingston and East Calder; Fauldhouse and the Briech Valley, Livingston North; Livingston South; 
In part: Whitburn and Blackburn (shared with Linlithgow)

Member of the Scottish Parliament

Election results

2020s

2010s

References

External links

Scottish Parliament constituencies and regions from 2011
Constituencies of the Scottish Parliament
2011 establishments in Scotland
Constituencies established in 2011
Livingston, West Lothian
Politics of West Lothian